Zerehune Gizaw (born 21 March 1965) is an Ethiopian long-distance runner. He competed in the men's marathon at the 1992 Summer Olympics, finishing in 61st place with a time of 2:28:25. He was the winner of the Helsinki City Marathon in 1994.

References

External links
 

1965 births
Living people
Place of birth missing (living people)
Ethiopian male long-distance runners
Ethiopian male marathon runners
Olympic athletes of Ethiopia
Athletes (track and field) at the 1992 Summer Olympics
20th-century Ethiopian people